The 12-episode Wandering Son Japanese anime television series is based on the manga series of the same name written and illustrated by Takako Shimura. It is directed by Ei Aoki and produced by the animation studio AIC Classic and production company Aniplex. Chief animator Ryūichi Makino is also the character designer and the screenplay was written by Mari Okada. Composed by Satoru Kosaki and Keiichi Okabe, both from Monaca, the music is produced by Aniplex with Jin Aketagawa as the sound director. The story depicts a male child named Shuichi Nitori who wants to be a girl, and Shuichi's friend Yoshino Takatsuki, a female child who wants to be a boy. The anime adapts the manga from volume five onwards, where the main characters enter their first year of junior high school.

The series aired in Japan between January 13 and March 31, 2011 on Fuji TV's Noitamina programming block. Crunchyroll is simulcasting the anime on their streaming website. Aniplex released the anime on six Blu-ray and DVD compilation volumes in Japan between April 27 and September 21, 2011. Episodes 10 and 11 were edited into a single episode which was broadcast on March 25, 2011, and were released individually on their respective BD/DVD volumes. Two pieces of theme music are used for the episodes: one opening theme and one ending theme.


Episode list

References

External links
Anime official website 

Lists of anime episodes